The 1982–83 Benson & Hedges World Series Cup was a One Day International (ODI) cricket tri-series where Australia played host to England and New Zealand. Australia and New Zealand reached the Finals, which Australia won 2–0. New Zealand and England would not contest the tri-series with Australia again until the 1990-91 season

Points Table

Result summary

1st Match

2nd Match

3rd Match

4th Match

5th Match

6th Match

7th Match

8th Match

9th Match

10th Match

11th Match

12th Match

13th Match

14th Match

15th Match

Final series
Australia won the best of three final series against New Zealand 2–0.

1st Final

2nd Final

References

1982 in Australian cricket
1982 in English cricket
1982 in New Zealand cricket
1982–83 Australian cricket season
1983 in Australian cricket
1983 in English cricket
1983 in New Zealand cricket
1982
1982-83
International cricket competitions from 1980–81 to 1985
1982-83
1982-83